Yenice, historically known as Harapya, is a village located in the Midyat District of the Mardin Province in southeastern Turkey. The village is populated by Kurds who are Yazidi and had a population of 54 in 2021.

Population

References 

Villages in Midyat District
Tur Abdin
Yazidi villages in Turkey